The Sara Foster Colburn House is an historic house at 7 Dana Street in Cambridge, Massachusetts.  Built in 1846, the -story wood-frame house is the best example of Gothic Revival architecture in the city.  The building has bargeboard decoration on its front gable, which frames a deeply recessed porch with Gothic-style openings and a distinctive wrought iron railing of a type typically found only in the Connecticut River valley.

The house was listed on the National Register of Historic Places in 1982.

See also
National Register of Historic Places listings in Cambridge, Massachusetts

References

Houses on the National Register of Historic Places in Cambridge, Massachusetts